Mike Williams (born May 11, 1954) an former American football player and coach. He served as the head football coach at Jacksonville State University from 1997 to his resignation in 1999, and compiled a record of 9–17. Williams was also an assistant coach at the University of Southern Mississippi and the University of Tennessee at Martin, as well as the head football coach at several Alabama high schools during the 1980s.

Coaching career
Williams' first head coaching position was at Samson High School in 1980. After a single season at Conecuh County High School in 1981 where he led the school to a record of seven wins and three losses he returned to Samson. In his second stint at Samson, Williams led the Tigers to a record of ten wins and ten losses in the 1982 and 1983 seasons. From Samson, Williams served as an assistant coach at Carroll High School from 1984 to 1986. At Andalusia High School from 1987 to 1989, Williams compiled an overall record of 18 wins and 12 losses.

Williams got his first college coaching job at Southern Miss in 1990. After Curley Hallman left the Golden Eagles for LSU, Williams was the only assistant that stayed at Southern Miss under newly hired head coach Jeff Bower. Williams remained at Southern Miss through their 1996 season as a running backs coach. On December 20, 1996, Williams was formally introduced as head coach at Jacksonville State. Williams abruptly resigned after the fourth game of the Gamecocks' 1999 season. His all-time record at Jacksonville State was 9 wins and 17 losses.

After remaining out of coaching for nearly six years, Williams accepted the posiiton of head coach at Greenville High School. During his lone season with the Tigers, Williams let Greenville to a record of two wins and eight losses. In 2006, former Williams assistant at Jacksonville State Jason Simpson hired him to serve as running backs coach at UT Martin.

Head coaching record

College

Notes

References

1954 births
Living people
High school football coaches in Alabama
Jacksonville State Gamecocks football coaches
Troy University alumni
Troy Trojans football players
Southern Miss Golden Eagles football coaches
UT Martin Skyhawks football coaches
People from Greenville, Alabama